Two Roads Books is an imprint of John Murray Press now a division of Hachette.

History
Announced by its Publisher, Lisa Highton, in September 2010, Two Roads started publishing in 2011. Publishing 12-15 books a year, with a mixture of narrative non-fiction and fiction, its stated mission is ‘stories-voices-places-lives’.  Two Roads is now an imprint of John Murray Press, and was shortlisted for Imprint of the Year in the British Book Awards 2019. Two Roads authors include Sir David Attenborough, Billy Connolly, Kirsty Wark, Akala, Monty Don and Ruth Hogan.

Notable publications
2011
 Ape House – Sara Gruen
 Water For Elephants – Sara Gruen
 The Vet: my wild & wonderful friends – Luke Gamble
 Farangi Girl – Ashley Dartnell
 Signs of life – Natalie Taylor
 The Puppy Diaries – Jill Abramson

2012
 The Sea on Our Skin – Madeleine Tobert
 A Century of Wisdom – Caroline Stoessinger
 The Reading Promise – Alice Ozma
 Cleo – Helen Brown
 Cats & Daughters – Helen Brown
 The Last Lecture – Randy Pausch
 The Vet: The big wild world – Luke Gamble
 Dream New Dreams – Jai Pausch
 The Stockholm Octavo – Karen Englemann
 The End of Your Life Book Club – Will Schwalbe
 Happier at Home – Gretchen Rubin

2013
 Doodlemum – Angie Stevens
 Island Wife – Judy Fairbairns
 Z: A Novel of Zelda Fitzgerald – Therese Anne Fowler
 Before I Say Goodbye – Susan Spencer-Wendel

References

External links
 

Book publishing companies of the United Kingdom
Hodder & Stoughton books